Argyrotaenia martini is a species of moth of the family Tortricidae. It is found in the United States, where it has been recorded from Arizona.

The wingspan is about 19–20 mm. Adults have been recorded on wing from July to August.

References

Moths described in 1960
martini
Moths of North America